The 2019 Central Michigan Chippewas football team represented Central Michigan University in the 2019 NCAA Division I FBS football season. They were led by first-year head coach Jim McElwain and played their home games at Kelly/Shorts Stadium as members of the West Division of the Mid-American Conference.

Previous season
The Chippewas finished the 2018 season 1–11 overall and 0–8 in the Mid American Conference. On November 23, 2018 following a loss to Toledo, head coach John Bonamego was fired. He finished at Central Michigan with a four-year record of 22–29. On December 2, the school hired Michigan wide receivers coach Jim McElwain, who previously served as head coach at Colorado State and Florida.

Preseason

MAC media poll
The MAC released their preseason media poll on July 23, 2019, with the Chippewas predicted to finish in sixth place in the West Division.

Schedule

Game summaries

Albany

at Wisconsin

Akron

at Miami (FL)

at Western Michigan

Eastern Michigan

New Mexico State

at Bowling Green

at Buffalo

Northern Illinois

at Ball State

Toledo

vs. Miami (OH)–MAC Championship Game

vs. San Diego State (New Mexico Bowl)

References

Central Michigan
Central Michigan Chippewas football seasons
Central Michigan Chippewas football